Moore's Station may refer to:
Moore's Station, California
Booneville, Kentucky, originally settled as Moore's Station
Moore's Station, Michigan
Moore's Station, New Jersey, alternate name of Moore, New Jersey
Moore's Station, Nevada

See also
Moores Station (disambiguation)